Manfred Stahnke (born 30 October 1951) is a German composer and musicologist from Hamburg. He writes chamber music, orchestral music and stage music. His music makes extensive use of microtonality. He plays piano and viola.

Life
Manfred Stahnke was born 1951 in Kiel. At the age of 15 he started to study violin, piano, composition in Lübeck.

Stahnke studied composition with Wolfgang Fortner (1970–1973), with Klaus Huber and Brian Ferneyhough (1973–1974), and with György Ligeti (1974–1979). In addition, he studied piano; his primary piano teacher was Edith Picht-Axenfeld.

He also holds a doctoral degree in musicology, with a thesis on the subject of Pierre Boulez's Third Piano Sonata (1979, under Constantin Floros in Hamburg).

In 1979–80 he went to the United States to study with the microtonalist Ben Johnston in Urbana, Illinois, and with the computer music researcher and composer John Chowning at Stanford University, California.

Since 1989 he is professor of composition and music theory at the Hochschule für Musik und Theater Hamburg. He is an emeritus since April 2019. 
Since 1999 he is a member of the Freie Akademie der Künste Hamburg, where he is the director of the Section of Music. He also was a member of the board of trustees of the Goethe Institute Munich for many years.

He plays the viola in the TonArt Ensemble.

Works 
 1979 RITUS, Fl Vc Pno, premiered by Wolpe-Trio, Essen, CD 1999
 1979-81 DER UNTERGANG DES HAUSES USHER (E.A.Poe), Microtonal Chamber Opera, Kiel 81
 1981 ZWEITES STREICHQUARTETT, arr. as 1985 KLARINETTENQUINTETT, prem. Kiel
 1982 WAHNSINN, DAS IST DIE SEELE DER HANDLUNG (poems of E.A.Poe), Music Theater: Female Voice & String Quartet, Braunschweig & Gelsenkirchen 1983, new version Berlin Staatsoper 2012
 1983 „PENTHESILEA“, DRITTES STREICHQUARTETT, Artus-Quartett, Bonn
 1983-86 HEINRICH IV (Pirandello), Opera, Kiel 87
 1986 TWO SCALES, 2 Bassoons, American Festival of Microtonal Music Ensemble, New York
 1982-86 PARTOTA, Piano solo, in Vallotti tuning, Hubertus Dreyer, Hamburg 86
 1987 EN CET HYBRIDE TAMPS, Chamber ensemble 4 Clarinets, 2 Violins, 2 Violas, Hrp, Yamaha DX7- II Synth, 2 Percussionists, ensemble modern, Saarbrücken 88, prem. new version Szombathely 90
 1987 PARTCH HARP (partly from EN CET HYBRIDE TAMPS), Harp in scordatura
 1987 CAPRA, Violin solo in scordatura, Michael Kollars, Hamburg 92, CD 2006 Barbara Lüneburg
 1987-88 DER MANDELBROTBAUM, Orch, SWR-Sinfonieorchester, Baden-Baden 92
 1989 MALAITA, Midi Guitar and Computer, premiere Seth Josel and Manfred Stahnke, Hamburg 90, CD 2018 Flavio Virzi
 1990 KREISLIEDER, Chamber ensemble Fl. Cl. Perc. Midi Git or Yamaha DX7-II Synth, Hrp V Va, Nieuw Ensemble, Amsterdam
 1990 CENTONAGE, Chamber ensemble Fl Ob Cl Tp Trb Perc Hrp, Yamaha DX7-II Synthesizer, 3 V, Va, Vc, ensemble modern, Frankfurt
 1991 ANSICHTEN EINES KÄFERS, Git in scordatura, prem. Frank Pschichholz, Moscow 92, complete prem. Satoshi Oba, Odense 95, CD Flavio Virzi 2018
 1992 PARTOTA II - FÜR GYÖRGY LIGETI, Piano AND Sampler, Hubertus Dreyer, Hamburg
 1994 HARBOR TOWN LOVE AT MILLENIUM'S END, Saxophon, Prepared Piano, Percussion, Accanto Trio, Donaueschingen 1994
 1994 STREETMUSIC I, Bass flute and Steeldrums, l'art pour l'art, Hamburg 97
 1994-98 „CICONIETTA“ PARTOTA III, Accordion solo, Margit Kern, Hamburg 95
 1995 STREETMUSIC III, Double Bass solo and Voice of the player, Frank Reinecke, Hamburg 1996, CD 2013
 1995 COWS & BELLS, 8 trombones
 1995 MUSIK FÜR DANIIL CHARMS II, Soprano, Viola, Keyboard, Chaosma Ensemble Basel
 1996 DER HALBANALPHABETISCHE ZEISIG, Gamba solo in scordatura, Simone Eckert, Hamburg 97, CD 2010
 1997 TRACE DES SORCIERS, Orch, Director Olaf Henzold, Donaueschingen 97, CD 1998
 1999 LUMPENGALERIE, Flute, Clarinet, Violin, Cello, Piano, Percussion, Ensemble Est-Est-Est, Bonn 1999, CD
 2000 IV. STREICHQUARTETT, München 2000
 2001 ORPHEUS KRISTALL, Multimedia Opera, Münchener Biennale 2002, Bayerischer Rundfunk, TV production
 2003 SCALES OF AGES, Saxophone Symphony, Alto Sax & Orch, John-Edward Kelly, Philharmonisches Orchester Heidelberg, Dir. Thomas Kalb, Heidelberg 2004
 2003 CALLING for bells & 2 (children's) choirs, Cantemus und Knabenchor St.Nikolai (Hamburg) & 4 churchbell sets from Hamburg: St.Katharinen, St.Petri, St.Michaelis, St.Jacobi
 2003 FRANKFURT MUSICBOX, V Va Vc Pno Perc, ensemble modern, Frankfurt
 2005 PARTOTA IX - Tanz und Tod, Accordion & Piano, Andreas Nebl, Oliver McCall, Trossingen 2006
 2005 THE ALPS BLUES CLONE, Vc & Zither, Martin Jaggi, Leopold Hurt, Hamburg
 2005 DIAMANTENPRACHT, Harp solo in scordatura, Gesine Dreyer, Hamburg 2006
 2005 ANA B CHRONICLES, Vc solo (arr. THE ALPS BLUES CLONE), Jan-Filip Tupa, Hamburg 2006
 2005 IMPANSION / EXPANSION, Tenor Recorder & Computer, Lucia Mense & Hans Koch, Köln 2006
 2006 SKINS & STRINGS, Perc Va Vc, Rumi Ogawa, Jagdish Mistry, Michael Kasper, Frankfurt/M, CD 2017
 2006 DANZBODNLOCK - Violinsinfonie, V solo & Orch, Barbara Lüneburg, SWR- Sinfonieorchester, Dir. Hans Zender, Donaueschingen
 2006 PARTOTA 12 - AMSEL, TROMMEL, LIED UND ZAHL - Piano duo in quartertones, Duo Différence (Frank Zabel, Stefan Thomas), prem. Berlin 2007
 2006 TOM'S TWIN, Trb solo, Patrick Menotti
 2007 FLÖTENMASCHINE, Fl or Bassfl & Tape dubbing, Beate-Gabriela Schmitt, CD 2017 Sonja Horlacher
 2007 DIE VOGELMENSCHEN VON ST. KILDA, 2 Bohlen Pierce Cl, Anna Bardeli, Nora-Louise Müller
 2008 HINTERHOFMUSICK, Orchestra (3 Ob, Tp, Perc, 32 strings in microtuning), Düsseldorfer Hofmusik & Düsseldorfer Sinfoniker, Dir. Mark-Andreas Schlingensiepen
 2009 CHANGGUflage, Changgu (Korean drum) & String trio, AsianArt ensemble, Berlin, CD 2011
 2002/2009 INNENOHR 14 Solo Strings (from "Orpheus Kristall")
 2010 ASYMMETRISCHER HOLZSCHNITT, V & Vc, Lisa Lammel, Sonja Lena Schmid, Hamburg 2011
 2011 HOLZSCHNITT, V Va Vc, 2 Pnos in quartertone distance, Mondrian ensemble, Basel 2011
 2011 CANTUS INFIRMUS, Pno & Keys in quartertone distance, 1 player, Bernhard Fograscher Hamburg 2012, Youtube video
 2011 ASYMPTOTICS, Fl & E-git, Sonja Horlacher, Flavio Virzi, Microfest Köln 2013, CD 2018
 2011 PALOMA METALLICA, Pno solo, Andrej Koroliov 2012
 2011 SUCH(T)MASCHINE, ensemble modern, Frankfurt 2012
 2013 BEHALTE DEN FLUG IM GEDÄCHTNIS, DER VOGEL IST STERBLICH, Cl Vc Pno, Trio Catch Mannheim 2014
 2014 FÜNFTES STREICHQUARTETT
 2016 PTITSCHKI (Birds), Soprano sax solo in quartertones, prem. Lemgo, Asya Fateyeva
 2018 WOLNY (Waves), 4 violins, Maria Gvodsdetskaya & ensemble, prem. Rostock 2019

References

External links 

always current overview about concerts, performances etc. by VAMH 

1951 births
Living people
20th-century classical composers
21st-century classical composers
German musicologists
Microtonal musicians
German opera composers
Male opera composers
Musicians from Kiel
German male classical composers
20th-century German composers
21st-century German composers
20th-century German male musicians
21st-century German male musicians